The 2012 Vancouver Whitecaps FC season was the Whitecaps' second season in Major League Soccer, the top tier of soccer in the United States and Canada. In 2011, the expansion Whitecaps FC struggled to find the results and finished at the bottom of the league table winning just six matches with none on the road. By finishing last overall in the regular season the Whitecaps FC received the 2nd overall pick in the 2012 MLS SuperDraft and 2012 MLS Supplemental Draft that were held in January 2012.

The Whitecaps second season began on March 10 against expansion side, and Canadian rivals, Montreal Impact at BC Place with a 2–0 victory. Vancouver set a MLS record by going 427 minutes without conceding a goal to start the season. The club qualified for the playoffs for the first time on October 23 when the Seattle Sounders defeated FC Dallas. They became the first Canadian MLS team to make the playoffs in MLS history.

Vancouver finished as runners-up in the 2012 Canadian Championship after losing to Toronto FC in the Final for the second consecutive season, under the current bracket format. The Whitecaps defeated FC Edmonton with an aggregate score of 5–1 in the semi-finals before falling 2–1 on aggregate to Toronto.

Season overview

January/February

By finishing last overall in the league table in 2011, the Vancouver Whitecaps received the 2nd overall draft choice in the 2012 MLS SuperDraft and Supplemental Draft. The SuperDraft was held on January 12 and the club selected Darren Mattocks with their first-round pick and Chris Estridge with their second-round pick. As a Generation Adidas player, Mattocks was already signed to a league contract prior to being drafted. The Whitecaps also selected four players in the Supplemental Draft, Gienir Garcia, Greg Klazura, Andrew Fontein and Mark Fetrow. Garcia was traded shortly after to Montreal in exchange for the discovery rights to Etienne Barbara.

Training camp for the 2012 MLS season began in Vancouver on January 23. Under new head coach, Martin Rennie, the Vancouver Whitecaps FC underwent a large number of personnel changes both on the pitch and off. Rennie replaced assistant coaches Colin Miller and Denis Hamlett with Paul Ritchie, Carl Robinson and Jake DeClute. He also acquired several high-profile players to add to the club. After signing Lee Young-Pyo and Lee Nguyen in December, the club acquired MLS All-star striker Sébastien Le Toux from the Philadelphia Union on January 31 in exchange for allocation money. On February 16 the Whitecaps also announced the signing of Middlesbrough F.C. midfielder, and Scottish international, Barry Robson as their newest designated player, replacing Mustapha Jarju who was released shortly before. Robson will join the club in July after his season with Middlesbrough has concluded.

The Vancouver Whitecaps FC spent ten days training at the Grande Sports World complex in Casa Grande, Arizona for the second consecutive season. During the training camp the club played in two friendlies against the Seattle Sounders and Real Salt Lake. Both matches ended in 1–1 draws with Camilo and Darren Mattocks scoring the goals for Vancouver. The Whitecaps returned to Vancouver for training and played a friendly against Victoria of the CIS. The Whitecaps won the match 2–1.

On February 21 the Whitecaps began training at the ESPN Wide World of Sports Complex in Orlando, Florida. The Whitecaps signed their second-round Supplemental Draft choice, Greg Klazura, on February 22. During their two-week training camp in Florida they competed in the Walt Disney World Pro Soccer Classic. Vancouver played three group stage matches against Montreal Impact, Houston Dynamo, and Sporting Kansas City. They finished the group stage with three wins while scoring seven goals, led by Le Toux with three, and conceding none.

March
 
The Vancouver Whitecaps won their first trophy as an MLS franchise when they defeated Toronto FC by a score of 1–0 in the Walt Disney Pro Soccer Classic Final on March 3. Camilo scored the lone goal of the match for Vancouver in the 10th minute. The club then played their final match of the preseason, a community shield friendly, against Martin Rennie's former club, Carolina RailHawks FC, the following day. The match also featured former RailHawks FC players Brad Knighton and Matt Watson. The Whitecaps tied the match at 2 with a last-minute goal by Davide Chiumiento but ultimately lost 4–2 on penalties.

The Whitecaps kicked off their second MLS season on March 10 against rivals Montreal Impact in front of a sold-out crowd of 21,000 at BC Place.  This was the first match between the two storied rival squads in Major League Soccer. The Whitecaps scored early with Sébastien Le Toux registering his first goal for Vancouver in the 4th minute after receiving a flicked on header from Eric Hassli before sliding the ball passed goalkeeper Donovan Ricketts. In the league's seventeen season history, Le Toux's strike was the fastest opening goal ever to start a season. The Whitecaps increased their lead when 2011 leading scorer, Camilo, scored his first goal of the season in the 54th minute. Joe Cannon made five saves to earn his first win, and clean sheet, of the season as the Whitecaps won their season opener 2–0. The match was watched by an average of 541,000 viewers in Canada, with a total of 2.5 million people tuning in for at least a portion of the match, on TSN and RDS making it the most-viewed MLS game ever in the country.

Vancouver played their first road match of the season on March 17 against Chivas USA at The Home Depot Center. Captain Jay DeMerit scored the lone goal, his first as a Whitecap, of the match with a header off a corner kick in the 68th minute. Goalkeepers Joe Cannon and Brad Knighton combined for the clean sheet and the Whitecaps won their first away match in their MLS history. Knighton replaced Cannon who was subbed off with an injury in the 41st minute. Joe Cannon was awarded the MLS Save of the Week for his stop on Casey Townsend in the 32nd minute.

The Whitecaps continued their streak of not conceding a goal on March 24 in a 0–0 draw with D.C. United. Cannon was awarded with his second consecutive Save of the Week when he blocked a Hamdi Salihi header off a corner kick in the 67th minute. Vancouver capped off the month of March with their fourth clean sheet of the season but, once again, failed to score themselves against the Philadelphia Union.

April

The Whitecaps saw their four-match unbeaten streak to open the season end on April 7 against the San Jose Earthquakes. Sébastien Le Toux scored a second half goal for Vancouver but Chris Wondolowski replied with a brace and San Jose won 3–1. The match also saw the Whitecaps set a new MLS record for shutout streak to open a season end at 427 minutes, a mark previously set by the New York Red Bulls at 421 minutes.

John Furlong, former CEO of VANOC for the 2010 Winter Olympics, was named Executive Chair of the Whitecaps on April 12.

Vancouver suffered their second consecutive 3–1 at the hands of Sporting Kansas City on April 18 before rebounding to beat both FC Dallas and Columbus Crew 1–0 on April 21 and 28 respectively. Camilo and Lee Young-Pyo scored the goals respectively.

May

The Whitecaps opened the month of May with the first leg of their semi-final fixture for the 2012 Canadian Championship in an away match against FC Edmonton of the NASL. They earned a 2–0 victory over their Canadian rivals with goals from Eric Hassli and Atiba Harris while Brad Knighton earned the clean sheet in his first start for the club. On May 5 the Whitecaps had a re-match with the San Jose Earthquakes at BC Place. Vancouver were able to defeat San Jose 2–1 despite falling behind in the 15th minute. Eric Hassli scored in the final minute of stoppage time to give the club its first ever win when trailing in a match. The match took place exactly thirty-eight years since the Whitecaps played their first ever competitive match as a club, also against the San Jose Earthquakes, where they were defeated by the same 2–1 scoreline.

On May 12 the Whitecaps suffered their worst defeat of the season to date dropping a 4–1 decision to the New England Revolution. Lee Nguyen, who was waived by the Whitecaps in the preseason, scored two goals and helped set up another. Vancouver drew 1–1 against Toronto FC in the first leg of the Canadian Championship. Ryan Johnson put the visitors ahead but Eric Hassli scored in stoppage time to salvage a draw. Hassli's goal was described by analysts as "jaw-dropping" and compared to his goal against Seattle Sounders FC in 2011, which received international acclaim and was a finalist for the 2011 Best Play ESPY Award and runner-up for MLS goal of the year.

Vancouver opened the 2012 Cascadia Cup against the Seattle Sounders at BC Place on May 19. Twice the Whitecaps earned the lead with goals from Alain Rochat and Camilo but both were answered by Eddie Johnson and Fredy Montero for Seattle with the match finishing in a 2–2 draw. Vancouver failed to win their first Canadian Championship losing 1–0 to Toronto FC, 2–1 on aggregate. The Whitecaps ended the month in Portland where they drew 1–1 with the Timbers. Darren Mattocks scored his first MLS goal in the 84th minute to pull the Whitecaps even.

June

On June 15, the Vancouver Whitecaps unveiled their new third kit. The design features an arbutus brown colour with sky blue trim. The new kit debuted on June 17 against Colorado where the Whitecaps won 1–0. On June 18 the club introduced Barry Robson to the media. Robson will be eligible to join the line-up on June 27. On June 28 the Whitecaps waived midfielder Floyd Franks and traded forward Tan Long to D.C. United.

July

Barry Robson made his club debut on July 4 against Colorado. Robson was named to the starting eleven by Martin Rennie and played 57 minutes before being subbed off. The Whitecaps won the match 1–0 on a goal by Darren Mattocks. The win brought Vancouver to 29 points, eclipsing their total of 28 points in 2011. On July 8 captain Jay DeMerit was named to the MLS All-Star first XI. The 2012 MLS All-Star game took place July 25 at PPL Park in Philadelphia. The MLS All-Stars defeated the 2012 UEFA Champions League and 2012 FA Cup winners, Chelsea, 3–2.

On July 11 it was announced that Davide Chiumiento would be transferred to FC Zürich. Further moves were made on July 13 when Sébastien Le Toux was traded to New York Red Bulls in exchange for Dane Richards. On July 16 the Whitecaps announced the addition of a third designated player, captain of the Scottish national team, Kenny Miller. Miller made his Whitecaps debut coming off the bench against San Jose a week later.

On July 20 Martin Rennie made more moves by trading away the club's first ever designated player Eric Hassli to Toronto FC in exchange for a first-round pick in the 2014 MLS SuperDraft and an international roster slot through the 2013 season. This also freed an international slot for the club in addition to the slot acquired from the trade.

August

The club made two depth acquisitions to begin the month of August signing Irish centre back Andy O'Brien and Brazilian midfielder Tiago Ulisses. O'Brien made his debut coming off the bench against Real Salt Lake on August 11.

October

On October 21 the Vancouver Whitecaps became the first Canadian MLS team to qualify for the MLS Playoffs. They entered the day needing either a win against Portland, an FC Dallas defeat, or a draw with Portland and a FC Dallas draw with Seattle. Vancouver fell 0–1 but still clinched as the Sounders defeated Dallas 3–1.

November

The team lost their one-game playoff game against Los Angeles Galaxy 2–1 despite opening the scoring in the third minute of the match. The Galaxy eventually went on to win the MLS Cup.

Players

Squad information

Transfers in

Transfers out

Club

Front office and staff

Statistics

Appearances and goals

|}
Last updated: January 7, 2013
Source: Vancouver Whitecaps FC
Italic: denotes player is no longer with team

Goalkeeper stats
{| border="1" cellpadding="4" cellspacing="0" style="margin: 1em 1em 1em 1em 0; background: #f9f9f9; border: 1px #aaa solid; border-collapse: collapse; font-size: 95%; text-align: center;"
|-
| rowspan="2" style="width:15px; text-align:center;"|No.
| rowspan="2" style="width:15px; text-align:center;"|Nat.
| rowspan="2" style="width:160px; text-align:center;"|Player
| colspan="4" style="width:160px; text-align:center;"|Total
| colspan="4" style="width:160px; text-align:center;"|Major League Soccer
| colspan="4" style="width:160px; text-align:center;"|MLS Cup Playoffs
| colspan="4" style="width:160px; text-align:center;"|Canadian Championship
|-
|style="width: 40px;"|
|style="width: 40px;"|
|style="width: 40px;"|
|style="width: 40px;"|
|style="width: 40px;"|
|style="width: 40px;"|
|style="width: 40px;"|
|style="width: 40px;"|
|style="width: 40px;"|
|style="width: 40px;"|
|style="width: 40px;"|
|style="width: 40px;"|
|style="width: 40px;"|
|style="width: 40px;"|
|style="width: 40px;"|
|style="width: 40px;"|
|-
| style="text-align: right;" |1
|
| style="text-align: left;" |Joe Cannon
|2,457
|79
|36
|1.32
|2,277
|73
|34
|1.34
|0
|0
|0
|0.00
|180
|6
|2
|1.00
|-
| style="text-align: right;" |18
|
| style="text-align: left;" |Brad Knighton
|1,052
|40
|10
|0.86
|782
|27
|7
|0.81
|90
|5
|2
|2.00
|180
|8
|1
|0.50
|-
| style="text-align: right;" |24
|
| style="text-align: left;" |Brian Sylvestre
|0
|0
|0
|0.00
|0
|0
|0
|0.00
|0
|0
|0
|0.00
|0
|0
|0
|0.00

Italic: denotes player is no longer with team

Starting XI 

Configuration based in August 2012 starting lineups.

Top scorers
Includes all competitive matches. The list is sorted by shirt number when total goals are equal.

Italic: denotes player is no longer with team

Top assists
Includes all competitive matches. The list is sorted by shirt number when total assists are equal.

Italic: denotes player is no longer with team

Disciplinary record
Includes all competitive matches. The list is sorted by position, and then shirt number.

Italic: denotes no longer with club.

Competitions

Pre-season

Arizona training

Walt Disney World Pro Soccer Classic

Friendlies

Overall

Major League Soccer

League table

Western Conference

Overall

Results summary

Results by round

Match results
Schedule

Note
 Indicates a match against a Cascadia Cup rival.

MLS Cup playoffs

Knockout round

Canadian Championship

The club participates in the four-team Canadian Championship which includes FC Edmonton, Montreal Impact and Toronto FC. The champion of the tournament is awarded the Voyageurs Cup and qualifies for the 2012–13 CONCACAF Champions League group stage. Each round will feature a two-legged home-and-away format. The team with the higher aggregate score from both matches will be declared the winner. Should there be a tie in the aggregate score, the away goals rule will be used to determine the winner. Should the away goals also be even then an additional 30 minutes of extra time will be played with the away goals rule no longer in effect. The final tiebreaker will be a penalty shootout.

Semi-finals

Final

MLS reserves

The Vancouver Whitecaps will compete in the West Division for the 2012 MLS Reserves season. The division consists of six teams, including Chivas USA, Los Angeles Galaxy, Portland Timbers, Seattle Sounders and San Jose Earthquakes. The Whitecaps will play each other team twice, once home and once away.

League table
West Division

Match results
Schedule

Cascadia Cup 

The Whitecaps have had a long-standing rivalry with the Pacific Northwest clubs Seattle Sounders FC and Portland Timbers, dating back to the 1970s when ancestry clubs of the same name played in the original and now-defunct North American Soccer League. The tri-member tournament will continue in 2012.

The winner is determined through league matches between the sides, and the club with the best record against both sides wins the trophy. The 2012 MLS season will see an unbalanced schedule due to an uneven number of teams with the addition of the Montreal Impact. As a result, the Whitecaps will play three matches each against Portland and Seattle. The odd number of matches means Vancouver will host the Sounders twice and Timbers once while visiting Seattle Portland once and twice respectively. This setup will alternate each year.

Recognition

MLS Save of the Week

MLS Team of the Week

MLS All-Stars

Miscellany

Allocation ranking 

Vancouver is in the No. 11 position in the MLS Allocation Ranking. The allocation ranking is the mechanism used to determine which MLS club has first priority to acquire a U.S. National Team player who signs with MLS after playing abroad, or a former MLS player who returns to the league after having gone to a club abroad for a transfer fee. A ranking can be traded, provided that part of the compensation received in return is another club's ranking.

Vancouver moved to the top position in the allocation ranking after the Montreal Impact exercised their allocation rights to acquire Eddie Johnson. On June 26 the Whitecaps swapped their allocation ranking with the Philadelphia Union, who were in the 12 position, in a trade. Philadelphia then used their allocation ranking to sign Bakary Soumaré.

International roster slots 
Vancouver have 11 MLS International Roster Slots for use in the 2012 season. Each club in Major League Soccer is allocated 8 international roster spots. Vancouver acquired one additional slot from Colorado Rapids in November 2010 and a second slot from Colorado in January 2012. They acquired a third additional slot from Toronto FC in July 2012.

Future draft pick trades 
Future picks acquired: 
2013 MLS SuperDraft Round 1 pick from Philadelphia Union
2013 MLS SuperDraft conditional pick from Real Salt Lake
2013 MLS Supplemental Draft Round 1 pick from Chicago Fire
2014 MLS SuperDraft Round 1 pick from Toronto FC
2014 MLS SuperDraft Round 2 pick from Colorado Rapids
2014 MLS SuperDraft Round 3 pick from Seattle Sounders FC
2015 MLS SuperDraft Round 3 pick from D.C. United

Future picks traded: 
2013 MLS SuperDraft Round 2 pick to Philadelphia Union

References

Vancouver Whitecaps FC seasons
Vancouver Whitecaps
Van